The 2012–13 season was Football Club Internazionale Milano's 104th in existence and 97th consecutive season in the top flight of Italian football.

Season overview
Inter confined his market to a few of purchases, as they were not yet ready for a deeper revolution: the most notable arrival being Rodrigo Palacio, from Genoa. For the first three months of 2012–13 season Inter achieved good results, especially in away games. However, during winter times, the side suffered from too many absences: Diego Milito and Javier Zanetti - for example - had long-term injuries. As a result, Inter had to use young players who did not have the requested experience and skills. It was Inter's worst season since 1993–94, as the club finished ninth and missed out on European football qualification. On 24 May 2013, Stramaccioni was sacked by the club, with successful former Napoli coach Walter Mazzarri taking over the next day.

Month-by-month account

June
On 6 June, Goran Pandev, who was on loan with Napoli on the previous season, signed a permanent contract with them for a fee of €8 million, lasting until 2015. One day later, Palacio's transfer become official when he signed a three-year contract worth €2.7 million per season.

Later on 29 June, Inter announced that Lúcio would be leaving Inter after it was agreed to cancel the final two years of his contract by mutual consent.

July
After a failed first season in Milan, Diego Forlán agreed to terminate the final year of his contract on 5 July. One day later, the club signed Matías Silvestre on loan from Palermo with an option to make the move permanent for €6 million.

On 9 May, Inter announced with signing of Slovenian goalkeeper Samir Handanović reported €11 million cash on a co-ownership deal, as well as co-ownership of Davide Faraoni. On 12 July, the team played its first friendly of the new season by easily achieving a 6–0 win against Trentino Team. Three days later, they won the second one, defeating Koper 2–0.

On 20 July, Inter announced that they had signed Gaby Mudingayi from Bologna on loan with an option to purchase for €750,000. A day later, Inter won its first pre-season trophy, the TIM Trophy, by beating Juventus and Milan to claim their eighth success. On 24 July, Inter continued with their winning streak in friendlies by defeating Como 3–2 at Stadio Giuseppe Sinigaglia.

On 28 July, Luc Castaignos was sold to Twente for €6 million. The same day, Inter draw 1–1 with Celtic at Celtic Park, as their winning streak came to an end.

August
Inter played its first competitive match on 2 August by comfortably winning 0–3 at Hajduk Split for the first leg of 2012–13 UEFA Europa League third qualifying round. In the returning leg one week later, Hajduk Split caused an upset by winning 0–2 at San Siro but nevertheless Inter progressed 3–2 on agreegate.

On 18 August, Inter played their first friendly ahead of the new season by defeating CA Bizertin 3–0 at Locarno. Three days later, Inter and Milan reached an agreement over an exchange deal involving Giampaolo Pazzini and Antonio Cassano, with a compensatory sum of €7.5 million in favor of the Nerazzurri.

In play-off round, Inter faced Vaslui. On 23 August in the first leg, Inter achieved a comfortable 0–2 away win thanks to the goals of Cambiasso and Palacio. This was also the last match of Maicon in an Inter shirt. The same day, Álvaro Pereira accepted a transfer to Inter from Porto for total fee of €10 million by signing a contract until June 2016.

Inter kicked off 2012–13 Serie A with a perfect 0–3 away win at newly promoted Pescara with Sneijder, Milito and Coutinho scoring the goals. On 30 August, Inter officially qualified in the UEFA Europa League group stage after a 2–2 home draw in the returning leg in San Siro. On the last day of the month, the Treble heroes Júlio César and Maicon were respectively sold to Queens Park Rangers and Manchester City.

September
Inter started September with a 1–3 home defeat to Roma with Cassano scoring his first Inter goal. The team bounced back by winning the third matchday 0–2 away at Torino. Cassano and Milito were the goalscorers.

On 20 September, Inter played its first match in Europa League group stage, equating 2–2 to Rubin Kazan with goals from Marko Livaja and Yuto Nagatomo. Back to Serie A three days later, Inter slumped into a 0–2 home defeat to Siena.

With goals from Pereira and Cassano, Inter achieved an important victory against Chievo in the matchday 5. In the last match of September, Inter defeated Fiorentina through Milito and Cassano goals at the first half, recording first home win in all competitions after five games without a win.

October
On 4 October, in the second game of Europa League group stage, Inter won 3–1 at Neftçi Baku with goals of Coutinho, Obi and Livaja. In the first Derby della Madonnina of the season, on 7 October, Samuel's early goal were enough to clinch the points for Inter despite playing with 10-man for about 40 minutes.

Inter continued their fine form by winning 2–0 home versus Catania, with Palacio and Cassano scoring, and also beating FK Partizan thanks to the winner of Palacio in Europa League group stage matchday 3.

In the ninth round of league, on 28 October, Inter played Bologna away. Ranocchia, Cambiasso and Milito were all in the scoresheet for the team, with the latter scoring his 100th Serie A goal, as Inter recorded their 5th consecutive league win. Inter continued their solid appearances in Serie A by extending their win record up to six matches after a 3–2 home win over Sampdoria.

November
Inter started November by ending Juventus' 49-game unbeaten run with a 3–1 victory at Juventus Stadium. Diego Milito scored a brace before Palacio sealed the win with a late goal. Matchday 4 for Inter in the Europa League against FK Partizan ended in a 1–3 away win, which ensued Inter progression to knockout phase.

On 11 November, after seven consecutive league wins, Inter was defeated 3–2 away by Atalanta which also ended Inter's longest winning away record (10). Palacio and Guarín scored the goals. One week later, Inter were stopped 2–2 by Cagliari at home, despite taking an early lead with a Palacio goal. A young Inter side were defeated 3–0 away by Rubin Kazan in Europa League matchday 5. Back in Serie A, Inter was defeated again, this time by Parma, slipping to 3rd position in the process.

December
In its first match of December, Inter won 1–0 at home against Palermo thanks to a Santiago García owngoal. On 6 December, in the final matchday of Europa League group stage, Inter drew 2–2 Neftchi Baku at home thanks to the brace from Marko Livaja, which secured them the second position in Group H and progression to the knockout phase. Three days later, Inter won its second consecutive match by beating title contenders Napoli 2–1 at San Siro. Fredy Guarín and Diego Milito scored the goals.

A goal from Lazio's Miroslav Klose in the last minutes were enough to beat Inter in Serie A matchday 17 on 15 December. To begin its Coppa Italia campaign, Inter played in the round of 16 Hellas Verona of Serie B. The match finished in a 2–0 home win thanks to the strikes of Antonio Cassano and Guarín. This match was also notable for Rodrigo Palacio efforts. He played as a goalkeeper for the final 15 minutes due to an injury of Luca Castellazzi, keeping a clean sheet and also making two saves.

Back in Serie A, Inter didn't go more than a 1–1 draw with Genoa at home, with Cambiasso scoring the only goal. Livaja missed a clear chance, shooting the post of an open goal.

January
On 4 January 2013, the fourth day of the winter transfer window, Inter announced an agreement with Lazio for the transfer of Italian striker Tommaso Rocchi. The transfer fee was €250,000 and the player signed a contract until the end of the season. The new year for the team began with a 3–0 devastating defeat to Udinese; Inter finished the match with 10 players.

Again in Serie A on 13 January, Inter returned to winning ways after three consecutive league defeats by clinching a 2–0 home win over Pescara. Fredy Guarín and Rodrigo Palacio scored the goals and also the youngster Marco Benassi made his league debut. Back in Coppa Italia for the quarter-finals, Inter achieved a hard-fought 3–2 victory over Bologna after an Andrea Ranocchia goal in the last minute of extra time.

On 20 January 2013, Wesley Sneijder was sold on controversial fashion to Galatasaray for €7.5 million. On the same day, Inter didn't go more than a 1–1 away draw against Roma with Palacio canceling Totti's penalty. Against the same opponent three days later, now for the first leg of Coppa Italia semi-final, Inter was defeated 2–1 with Palacio again scoring against capital club. One day later, Alfred Duncan was loaned to Livorno.

On 26 January, the young talent Philippe Coutinho was sold to Premier League club Liverpool for €10 million. The transfer was made official on 30 January. On 27 January, Inter were held by Torino who earned a 2–2 draw at San Siro. Chivu and Cambiasso scored Inter's goals.

On 30 January, McDonald Mariga was sent on loan at fellow Serie A club Parma. Also, Marko Livaja was transferred to Atalanta as part of Ezequiel Schelotto's transfer at Inter. One day later, the final day of the January transfer window period, Juan Pablo Carrizo was signed from Lazio for €250,000. Hot prospect Mateo Kovačić was signed for €11 million plus bonuses from Dinamo Zagreb. Also Zdravko Kuzmanović joined the team from VfB Stuttgart for an undisclosed fee.

February
Inter begun the month with a 3–1 away defeat to Siena. Cassano scored his team's only goal. On 10 February, goals from Cassano, Ranocchia and Milito ensured Inter three points against Chievo, their first after four three matches. Four days later, in first round of the round of 32 in Europa League, Inter achieved a comfortable 2–0 home win over CFR Cluj with a brace from Palacio. Striker Diego Milito was injured in the seventh minute with a collateral ligament injury, anterior cruciate ligament, and capsule in his left knee. Two days later, Milito announced that the surgery to repair the injury was a success, but the player will not return to the pitch for at least six months, ruling him out of contention for the remainder of the season.

On 17 February, Inter fell away to Fiorentina 4–1 in the Serie A matchday 25, with Cassano scoring the Inter goal. In the second leg of the round of 32 in Europa League, Inter easily won 3–0 at Stadionul Dr. Constantin Rădulescu with a brace from Guarín and a goal from Benassi, progressing to round of 16 with the aggregate 5–0.

On 24 February, in the second Derby della Madonnina, Stephan El Shaarawy gave Milan the lead in the first half, only for Ezequiel Schelotto to later equalize, salvaged a 1–1 draw for Inter.

March
On 3 March, Inter achieved a hard-fought victory against Catania at Stadio Angelo Massimino. The team was two goals down at half-time, but a goal from Ricky Álvarez and a brace from substitute Palacio, including one in the last minute, ensured three points for the Nerazzurri.

Four days later, Inter suffered a 3–0 loss at the hands of Tottenham Hotspur in the first leg of Europa League round of 16. The team continued with their unstable from by falling to Bologna 1–0 at home.

On 14 March, in the returning leg at San Siro, Inter sent the match to extra-time by winning 3–0 at regular time with the goals of Cassano, Palacio and an owngoal from William Gallas. At extra-time, Tottenham got one back with a goal from Emmanuel Adebayor, only for Inter to strike back with a header from Álvarez, winning the match 4–1, which was not enough as the team was knocked-out due to away goal rule.

The next Serie A match between Sampdoria and Inter was postponed on 2 April due to bad weather.

April
Inter started the month by winning the postponed match against Sampdoria 0–2 with both goals scored by Palacio, the second in the last moments after an individual effort. Palacio strained his left hamstring, ultimately ending his season prematurely. Four days later, the brace of Álvarez and the goal of Rocchi were not enough as Inter suffered a shock 3–4 home loss to Atalanta. Striker Cassano suffered a hamstring injury that kept him sidelined for a month, thus ending his season.

In the next matchday away against Cagliari, Inter suffered another defeat, this time 2–0 with both goals coming for the substitute Mauricio Pinilla. Yuto Nagatomo came in the second half and played only eight minutes after suffering e knee injury which ended his season. Also the midfielder Walter Gargano ended the season due to a thigh injury. This loss descended the team to the 7th position. Manager Andrea Stramaccioni dubbed the season as "cursed".

In the returning leg of Coppa Italia semi-final versus Roma, Inter initially took the lead through a Jonathan goal, but Roma fired back with a brace from Destro and a goal from Vasilis Torosidis, before Inter scoring another one with Álvarez. The match finished 2–3 for Roma and Inter was eliminated with the aggregate 5–3.

On 21 April, back in Serie A, Inter won against Parma with a late goal from Rocchi. The month ended with a 1–0 away defeat to Palermo. The legendary captain Javier Zanetti suffered an achilles tendon injury that kept him sidelined for the next six months.

May
The last month of the season begun on with a 3–1 away defeat to Napoli. Álvarez scored the temporary equalizer in the 23rd minute with a penalty kick before Cavani scored another two goals to conclude the match. In the next matchday, Inter suffered another 3–1 defeat, this time at home at the hands of Lazio with Álvarez again scoring his team's only goal.

On 12 May, Inter didn't go more than a goalless draw at Genoa in the matchday 37. Youngster Lukas Spendlhofer made his senior debut by playing in the last 13 minutes. The final match of the season ended with a 2–5 humiliating defeat to Udinese. Juan Jesus scored his first goal for Inter, while Rocchi scored another one in his final Inter match, assisted by the returning Palacio.

Inter finished the season in the 9th position in league, remaining out of European football for the first time since 1999–2000. This was also Inter's worst finish in Serie A since 1993–94. On 24 May, five days after the end of the season, head coach Andrea Stramaccioni was fired and replaced by Walter Mazzarri.

Kit

Kit information
Nike continued its supply of the Inter Milan kit, a relationship dating back to the 1998-99 season. Pirelli was the current sponsor, dating back to the 1995-96 season.
Home: All-new Inter Milan's home shirt would remain the black-blue traditional stripes but the stripes are slightly wider than previous season. The sleeves of Inter Milan's home shirt was solid black instead of black-blue traditional stripes. The shorts and socks remained black colour.
Home alternate: Same as home but including white alternate shorts.
Away: The away kit was featured a controversially red which was the color of Inter Milan's city arch-rivals A.C. Milan with black-blue stripes in the sleeve-cuffs. The shorts and socks were also red.
Third: Previous season's white shirt with black-blue sash across and also white shorts and white socks confirmed as third kit.
Third alternate: Same as third kit but featured black shorts.

Players

Squad information

Transfers

In

Summer

Winter

Spend :  €46.5M

Out

Summer

Winter

 Transfer income:  € 31.2M
 Co-ownership income:  € 8.5M
 Total income :  € 39.7M

Overall transfer activity

Spending
 Summer:   € 46.5M
 Winter:  € 19.2M
 Total:  € 65.2M

Income
 Summer:  € 32.5M
 Winter:  € 17.7M
 Total:  € 50.2M

Expenditure
 Summer:  € 14M
 Winter:  € 1.5M
 Total:  € 15.5M

Club

Non-playing staff

Pre-season and friendlies

2012 Indonesia tour
The Nerazzurri played two friendlies during their stay in Indonesia and both took place in Jakarta's Gelora Bung Karno Stadium, which hosted training sessions. The first match, held on 24 May, saw Inter took on a mixed starting eleven made up of players from the Indonesia under-23 side and the best players from the Indonesian Premier League. Inter met the Indonesia senior national team in their second game on 26 May.

TIM Trophy

Other friendlies

Competitions

Overview

Serie A

League table

Results summary

Results by round

Matches

Notes
Note 1: Postponed from 17 March 2013 due to heavy rains in Genoa

Coppa Italia

Round of 16

Quarter-finals

Semi-finals

UEFA Europa League

Third qualifying round

The draw for UEFA Europa League Third qualifying round will take place on 20 July 2012. First leg is played on 2 August 2012 and second leg on 9 August 2012.

Play-off round

The draw for UEFA Europa League Play-off round will take place on 10 August 2012. First leg is played on 23 August 2012 and second leg on 30 August 2012.

Group stage

Knockout phase

Round of 32

Round of 16

Statistics

Squad statistics
{|class="wikitable" style="text-align: center;"
|-
!
! style="width:70px;"|League
! style="width:70px;"|Europe
! style="width:70px;"|Cup
! style="width:70px;"|Total Stats
|-
|align=left|Games played       || 38 || 14 || 4 || 56
|-
|align=left|Games won          || 16 || 8  || 2 || 26
|-
|align=left|Games drawn        || 6  || 3  || 0 || 9 
|-
|align=left|Games lost         || 16 || 3  || 2 || 21
|-
|align=left|Goals scored       || 55 || 27 || 8 || 90
|-
|align=left|Goals conceded     || 57 || 17 || 7 || 81
|-
|align=left|Goal difference    || -2 || 10 || 1 || 9
|-
|align=left|Clean sheets       || 17 || 3  || 1 || 21
|-
|align=left|Goal by Substitute || 6  || 9  || 2 || 17
|-
|align=left|Total shots        || – || – || –|| –
|-
|align=left|Shots on target    || – || – || –|| –
|-
|align=left|Corners            || – || – || –|| –
|-
|align=left|Players used       || 36 || 35 || 28 || –
|-
|align=left|Offsides           || – || – || –|| –
|-
|align=left|Fouls suffered     || – || – || –|| –
|-
|align=left|Fouls committed    || – || – || –|| –
|-
|align=left|Yellow cards       || 84 || 26 || 10 || 120
|-
|align=left|Red cards          || 4 || 1 || –|| 5
|-

Players Used: Internazionale has used a total of – different players in all competitions.

Goalscorers

Last updated: 19 May 2013

Source: Soccerway

Clean sheets
The list is sorted by shirt number when total appearances are equal.

Disciplinary record
Includes all competitive matches. The list is sorted by position, and then shirt number.

Last Updated: 22 November 2012

References

External links
Official website

Inter Milan seasons
Inter Milan
Internazionale